Kerolin Nicoli Israel Ferraz (born 17 November 1999), commonly known as Kerolin, is a Brazilian professional footballer who plays for the North Carolina Courage in the National Women's Soccer League (NWSL) and for the Brazil national team as a forward.  In 2018, she was elected the breakout female player in the Brasileirão by the Brazilian Football Confederation, having scored 14 goals in 35 games for Ponte Preta.

Early life 
Kerolin was raised by her mother and was estranged from her father. The family lived in Bauru, then moved to Campinas, where they lodged on a farm as they could not afford to pay rent. When she was 12 years old Kerolin was hospitalised with osteomyelitis and cellulitis in her leg and advised to stop playing contact sport.

Club career 
Kerolin was among several promising young footballers to emerge from the youth system of Valinhos Futebol Clube, a women's team run by the local authority's sports and leisure department and coached by Ana Lúcia Gonçalves. Valinhos agreed a collaboration with Guarani FC in January 2016, to enter the 2016 Campeonato Paulista de Futebol Feminino as Guarani/Valinhos.

When Associação Atlética Ponte Preta decided to form a women's section in 2017, they took over the Valinhos club, with 17-year-old Kerolin among the squad they inherited. She was voted the best player of the 2017 Campeonato Paulista after scoring 10 goals in 21 games for semi-finalists Ponte Preta.

She was then sent on loan to Corinthians/Audax for their successful 2017 Copa Libertadores Femenina campaign in October 2017. She scored in a penalty shootout win over Colo-Colo following a 0–0 draw in the final at Estadio Arsenio Erico, Asunción.

In 2018 she scored 14 goals in 35 games for Ponte Preta and was named Campeonato Brasileiro de Futebol Feminino "Revelação" at the end of season awards. It was reported that Kerolin's consistently good performances for Ponte Preta and the youth national teams made her a transfer target for other Brazilian clubs, as well as for professional clubs in France and China.

The combined Corinthians/Audax team which Kerolin had helped to win the 2017 Copa Libertadores split when Corinthians withdrew from that partnership and set up their own women's team. This left Audax with a slot at the 2018 Copa Libertadores Femenina but with no team. A deal was made for Valinhos (who had been playing as Ponte Preta in domestic competitions) to represent Audax at the Copa Libertadores. Kerolin scored in a 4–0 win over Peñarol, but Audax were eliminated at the group stage.

Sociedade Esportiva Palmeiras urgently required a women's team in December 2018, as they faced being banned from the lucrative men's Copa Libertadores under CONMEBOL rules which required all participants to run women's teams. A partnership agreement saw Palmeiras agree to fund the salaries of the Valinhos players and staff, who would use the Palmeiras name but continue to play and train in Valinhos.

In January 2019 Kerolin agreed the transfer to Palmeiras, signing a one-year contract and joining up again with her previous coach Ana Lúcia Gonçalves. The following month it was announced that Kerolin had failed a doping test taken after playing for Audax in a match at the 2018 Copa Libertadores Femenina. Kerolin's sample revealed traces of GW1516. She remained provisionally suspended by CONMEBOL in July 2019, when Palmeiras's coach Gonçalves was sacked on suspicion of involvement in doping cases affecting the clubs she had worked at and inappropriately acting as a sports agent for the players in her charge.

Madrid
In April 2021, having served her ban, Kerolin transferred to Madrid CFF. She joined several other Brazilian players at the Spanish Primera División club, and thanked God for the opportunity to restart her football career.

International career
Kerolin was one of four Guarani/Valinhos players to be called up by the Brazil women's national under-17 football team for the 2016 South American U-17 Women's Championship. She remained in the squad for the 2016 FIFA U-17 Women's World Cup in Jordan. In 2018, Kerolin scored two goals over three games she played representing the Brazil women's national under-20 football team at the FIFA U-20 Women's World Cup in France.

The senior Brazil women's national football team head coach Vadão called Kerolin up for the first time in September 2018, for a friendly match against England at Meadow Lane, Nottingham. She earned her first cap in the match, appearing as a 56th-minute substitute for Debinha in Brazil's 1–0 defeat.

After breaking into the senior national team, she was praised by veteran teammate Formiga: "Kerolin has a huge future. She's got so much talent and she doesn't have fear. If she keeps her feet on the ground, she can go as far as she wants. It's up to her."

Kerolin was not eligible to play at the 2019 FIFA Women's World Cup because she was provisionally suspended from football and still awaiting the final judgement from CONMEBOL in respect of her failed doping tests.

On 6 January 2021, Kerolin's suspension ended and she was called into a national team training camp for evaluation by Brazil's new coach Pia Sundhage. Sundhage said: "I heard a lot of good things about her [Kerolin]. She is an excellent player. Yes, she has been out of action for two years, but we will see how she will do."

International goals

References

External links 
 

1999 births
Living people
Brazilian women's footballers
Footballers from São Paulo
Brazil women's international footballers
Women's association football forwards
Doping cases in association football
Brazilian sportspeople in doping cases
Primera División (women) players
Madrid CFF players
Brazilian expatriate sportspeople in Spain
Expatriate women's footballers in Spain
Brazilian expatriate women's footballers
Brazilian expatriate sportspeople in the United States
Expatriate women's soccer players in the United States
North Carolina Courage players
National Women's Soccer League players